Monosyntaxis trimaculata is a moth of the family Erebidae. It was described by George Hampson in 1900. It is found on Borneo. The habitat consists of upper montane forests.

References

Lithosiina
Moths described in 1900